Eye of the Beholder is a 1988 album by the Chick Corea Elektric Band. It features Chick Corea with guitarist Frank Gambale, saxophonist Eric Marienthal, drummer Dave Weckl and bassist John Patitucci.

Track listing
All tracks written by Chick Corea
"Home Universe" – 2:43
"Eternal Child" – 4:51
"Forgotten Past" – 2:58
"Passage" – 4:55
"Beauty" – 7:55
"Cascade - Part I" – 1:53
"Cascade - Part II" – 5:18
"Trance Dance" – 5:50
"Eye of the Beholder" – 6:38
"Ezinda" – 6:54
"Amnesia" – 3:26

Vinyl Version has only tracks 1-9 (GRP-A-91053)

Personnel 
Musicians
 Chick Corea – acoustic piano, synthesizers, arrangements
 Frank Gambale – guitars
 John Patitucci – basses
 Dave Weckl – drums
 Eric Marienthal – saxophones
 John Novello – synthesizers

Production
 Chick Corea – producer, mixing, liner notes, cover concept 
 Dave Grusin – executive producer
 Ron Moss – executive producer
 Larry Rosen – executive producer
 Joe Hasse – recording manager 
 Bernie Kirsh – engineer, mixing
 Duncan Aldrich – assistant engineer
 Mike Reese – mastering at The Mastering Lab (Hollywood, California)
 Larry Mah – technical maintenance
 Mike Thompson – keyboard technician 
 Mark Francovich – studio manager
 Evelyn Brechtlein – production assistant 
 Robert Schöller – cover painting

Chart performance

References

1988 albums
Jazz fusion albums by American artists
Chick Corea albums
GRP Records albums